The Ligier JS55 is a sports prototype race car, designed, developed, and built by Ligier, in collaboration with Onroak Automotive, conforming to FIA Group CN regulations, to compete in sports car racing, since 2014.

References 

Sports prototypes
Ligier racing cars